MQL may refer to:
 Mbelime, an Oti–Volta language
 Merseyside Quiz Leagues
 MetaQuotes Language, the programming language of MetaTrader 4 software
 Metaweb Query Language, the programming language of Freebase software
 Mildura Airport, IATA code MQL
 Molecular Query Language, a query language used in chemoinformatics
 Marketing Qualified Lead
 Minimum quantity lubrication, a type of lubrication using minimal lubricant, with applications in bearings and cutting fluids
 Manchester Quays Ltd, a partnership between Manchester City Council and Allied London